General elections were held in Papua and New Guinea for the first time on 10 November 1951.

Electoral system
The Legislative Council was formed following the amalgamation of the Territory of Papua and the Territory of New Guinea after World War II. The bill passed by the Australian parliament provided for a 29-member Council consisting of the Administrator, 16 civil servants, nine members appointed by the Administrator (three representatives of the indigenous population, three representing European settlers and three representing missionaries) and three elected Europeans. The Administrator served as presiding officer of the legislature.

Voting was restricted to residents aged 21 or over who had lived in the territory for the last 12 months prior to registering to vote and were not classed as a native or alien. The Chinese community were also given the right to vote alongside Europeans. Candidates had to have lived continuously in the territory for the three years prior to submitting their nomination paper and not be a public employee.

The three elected members were elected from three single-member constituencies, New Guinea Islands, New Guinea Mainland and Papua by preferential voting.

Results

Appointed members

Aftermath
The new Legislative Council met for the first time in Port Moresby on 26 November.

In February 1952 Steven Lonergan (Government Secretary) and R.E.P. Dwyer (Director of Agriculture) replaced Claude Champion and Colin Marr, who had been acting in their positions at the time the council was appointed. Thomas Byrne died in February 1952 and was temporarily replaced by Acting Chief Collector of Customs Thomas Grahamslaw until Frank Lee was appointed as Byrne's permanent replacement later in the year.

Bert Jones was replaced by the new Director of Native Affairs Alan Roberts in November 1953. C.D. Bates (District Commissioner for Morobe) and Douglas Macinnis (Secretary of Lands, Surveys and Mines) also joined the Council during its term.

References

Elections in Papua New Guinea
Papua
1951 in Papua New Guinea
Politics of Papua and New Guinea
Election and referendum articles with incomplete results
November 1951 events in Oceania